Ana Cecilia "Chia" Orillac Arías, (born March 1, 1970, in Ciudad de Panamá, Panamá), is a Panamanian beauty pageant contestant winner of the Señorita Panamá 1991 title. Also represented Panama in Miss Universe 1992, the 41st Miss Universe pageant was held at Queen Sirikit National Convention Center, Bangkok, Thailand on May 8, 1992.

She represented Panamá Centro state.

References

External links
 Señorita Panamá official website

1970s births
Living people
Miss Universe 1992 contestants
Panamanian beauty pageant winners
People from Panama City
Señorita Panamá